Markfield is a large village in both the National Forest and Charnwood Forest and in the Hinckley and Bosworth district of Leicestershire, England.  The settlement dates back to at least the time of the Norman conquest and is mentioned in the Domesday Book under the name Merchenefeld. A variant of this is still used as the name for the village primary school, Mercenfeld. It is to the south-east of Junction 22 of the M1, and to the south of the A50. The highest point in Markfield is shown on OS sheet 129 at 222 metres above sea level.  Nearby places are Newtown Linford, Groby, Field Head, and Stanton under Bardon. In the 1841 census its population was recorded at 1,203.  In the 2011 census the  parish had a population of 5681. Markfield is within the LE67 postcode district. In 2012 Hinckley & Bosworth Borough Council published an overview of Markfield conservation area.



History

Doomsday book 
Markfield is shown in the Domesday Book published in 1070 as having 2 small households.  Ulf is shown as the lord of Markfield, Groby Blaby and Ratby in the hundred of Guthlaxton  in Leicestershire in 1066.  By 1086, the value had increased fivefold to £0.50 and the lord was Hugh of Grandmesnil who was also associated with the hundreds of Goscote, Guthlaxton and Gartree in Leicestershire.

John Wesley 

Markfield has close links with the Methodist movement and according to a blue plaque on the church, its founder John Wesley paid 13 visits.  He was allowed to preach in the parish church as he was friendly with the rector but crowds became so large, he would often preach on the village green. The parish church of St Michaels and all Angels is a grade II listed building.  There are two other churches, Holy Trinity Methodist chapel and the Congregational church but the original Methodist chapel (temperance hall) is no longer used.

Worship

Education

Facilities 

The village benefits greatly from being surrounded by easily accessible countryside. There are a variety of public footpaths radiating out from the village - including the "Leicestershire Round", which passes along Main Street. To the north-western side of the village lies the Hill Hole Nature Reserve. Hill Hole is the highest point within the village and from the top of this quarried granite outcrop there are extensive views across the Midland Plain (43 miles to the Clent Hills), southwards to the Cotswolds and eastwards towards the Leicestershire/Lincolnshire boundary. Almost adjoining Hill Hole are the Altar Stones playing fields and the Blacksmiths Fields nature reserve.
 

Markfield has two public houses, the Queens Head and the Bulls Head. The Coach and Horses, whilst within Markfield parish, is in the village of Fieldhead.  Markfield has Chinese and Indian takeaways, a fish and chip shop, a newsagent,  an independent shop selling organic produce, a Co-Operative Supermarket,  a hardware shop, a financial advisory office, a GP surgery, a chemist, a Londis supermarket, a post office, a new library and a cafe. There are also several hair-dressing salons and an industrial estate. The former public house known as the Red Lion  has reopened as an Indian restaurant. The George public house as shown in the photograph was previously named 'The Boot.  The village has a well-funded and run Community Centre built in 1985 which has replaced the old Markfield Memorial Miners Institute as the main community building in the village. There is a Travelodge hotel located on the A50;

Industry
 
Markfield has a long association with the quarrying industry and has a particular type of granite, microdiorite named after it. The granite stone (microdiorite) 'Markfieldite' is a very hard granite found in the local area and used in roadstone and railway construction. The former headquarters of Aggregate Industries (now under the Holcim company) was in Markfield and in the last few years a major expansion of the Bardon Hill Quarry into the parish of Markfield has begun  creating a large extension which will expand the life of Bardon for another 40 years.

In 2009, a private contractor filed for permission to build a brand new housing estate by London Road. A petition to prevent such housing being built took place, arguing that the local primary school, public transport and other services could not cope with the large influx of new residents. The petition to prevent the housing development failed despite the Borough Council refusing the application (it was approved on appeal to the Secretary of State), and the last few houses have recently been completed.

Geology
Markfield rests on Precambrian volcanic and sedimentary rocks, and the rare mineral diorite is sometimes called markfieldite because it is found in the village.

Sport
The Markfield Greyhound and Whippet Track was opened for greyhound racing on 3 January 1931 by the Old Coach & Horses Inn on Leicester Road. The racing was independent (not affiliated to the sports governing body the National Greyhound Racing Club) and was known as a flapping track, which was the nickname given to independent tracks. Distances were 330 and 500 yards but the track only survived one year.

See also
 Cliffe Hill Mineral Railway
 Markfield local history group

References

Villages in Leicestershire
Civil parishes in Leicestershire
Hinckley and Bosworth